Bernard Bouffinier (born January 22, 1943) is a French sprint canoer who competed in the late 1960s. At the 1968 Summer Olympics in Mexico City, he was eliminated in the semifinals of the C-2 1000 m event.

References
Sports-reference.com profile

1943 births
Canoeists at the 1968 Summer Olympics
French male canoeists
Living people
Olympic canoeists of France
Place of birth missing (living people)